The Church of St Swithin is a parish church in Ganarew, south Herefordshire, England. The parish church is dedicated to St Swithin, although the 1868 National Gazetteer notes a dedication to St Luke. The parish is within the Church of England Diocese of Hereford, and the church is a Grade II listed building.

History
Giles Rawlines served as rector in 1624. Tamalanc, a son of Brychan, may be the same person as Tiuinauc (or Tywinauc or Tywannog), a patron saint connected with the Church of St Swithin's history. The church was rebuilt in about 1850 by John Prichard, a noted church builder and restorer of the Victorian period. The church required the expensive restoration because of the failing foundations.

Architecture and fittings
The church, of English Gothic architectural style, is described by Pevsner as Middle Pointed or Decorated Period. The building is of coursed sandstone rubble with ashlar dressings and has a decorative tiled roof with bands of fishscale tiles. The nave, south porch, chancel and north vestry, are in the Decorated style. The nave has two square-headed windows with hoodmoulds. They have cusped ogee-headed lights and spandrels.  A square-set bellcote is partly supported by a central buttress at the west end and has similar cusped ogee-headed openings in square surrounds and spirelet with decorative lucarnes, and three-cusped ogee-headed lancets in the chancel.

The church interior has a decorative arch-braced roof with moulded members and cusped wind-braces. There is a mock sepulchral recess in the north wall of the chancel with cusping and crocket ornament.  The reredos forms the village war memorial, a sculpture in white marble featuring the figure of Christ accompanied by two angels.

Grounds

The graveyard contains a Gothic pinnacle memorial to the Bannerman family who lived nearby at Wyastone Leys. The medieval churchyard cross is a scheduled ancient monument.
There is also a war grave of a Royal Engineers soldier of World War I.

References

External links

Grade II listed churches in Herefordshire
Diocese of Hereford
Ganarew
John Prichard buildings